Empresa de Transportes Aéreos Norte do Brasil Ltda – Aeronorte was a Brazilian airline founded in 1940 that operated in the north and northeast regions of Brazil. It was bought by Aerovias Brasil in 1953 but maintained some degree of autonomy. When Varig bought Aerovias Brasil, Aeronorte was incorporated into Varig.

History
Aeronorte was founded on December 30, 1949. In December 1950 Aeronorte rented a Junkers Ju 52 from VASP, and initiated flights from São Luís to Belém, to Carolina, and to Fortaleza, Recife and Salvador da Bahia.

It was acquired by Aerovias Brasil on January 15, 1953, but continued to operate as an autonomous unit in partnership with its new owner. When Real Transportes Aéreos acquired Aerovias Brasil in 1954 Aeronorte continued to operate with some autonomy as part of the consortium. This arrangement was dissolved in 1961 when Varig bought and integrated Aerovias Brasil, Real and its subsidiaries.

Destinations
In January 1956 Aeronorte served 24 cities in the northeast region of Brazil.

Fleet

Accidents and incidents
12 August 1951: a Lockheed L 10A Electra registration PP-NBD, had an accident in Turiaçu, Maranhão. Two crew members and one passenger died.
13 January 1953: a Lockheed L 10A Electra registration PP-NBC, had an accident while trying an emergency landing in the locality of Carema, Municipality of Rosário, Maranhão. Three crew members died.
15 March 1961: a Douglas DC-3 registration PP-YQS operating a flight from São Paulo had to divert to Ponta Grossa because of bad weather at the intended destination. The aircraft crashed into a hill while approaching the runway. Three crew members died.

See also
List of defunct airlines of Brazil

References

Defunct airlines of Brazil
Airlines established in 1940
Airlines disestablished in 1961